The Delinquents is a 1960 Spanish drama film directed by Carlos Saura. It was entered into the 1960 Cannes Film Festival.

Plot
Julián, Ramón, Juan, el Chato, Paco and Manolo are six young people from the depressed, suburban and shantytown outskirts of Madrid who survive off the product of their assaults, thefts and robberies. Only one of them, Juan, eventually works as a porter in the Legazpi fruit market, and it is him that the others try to help, in solidarity, to make his dream of being a bullfighter come true. Although they manage to collect the money that the intermediary asks for, everything goes wrong. Paco and El Chato are identified by a taxi driver who was the victim of a robbery while selling tickets for his friend's debut; Paco, fleeing from him, hides in a sewer and, at dawn, appears dead in a dunghill. In the afternoon, in the Plaza de Vista Alegre, the bullfight is held with a disastrous result: between boos and whistles, after several failed attempts, Juan manages to kill the bull.

Cast
 Manuel Zarzo as Julián
 Luis Marín as Ramón
 Óscar Cruz as Juan
 Juanjo Losada as El Chato
 María Mayer as Visi
 Ramón Rubio as Paco
 Rafael Vargas as Manolo
 Carmen Sánchez as Mujer cotilla

References

External links

1960 films
Spanish drama films
1950s Spanish-language films
1960 drama films
Spanish black-and-white films
Films directed by Carlos Saura
Bullfighting films
1950s Spanish films